Caspicola is a monotypic genus of crustaceans belonging to the monotypic family Caspicolidae. The only species is Caspicola knipovitschi.

References

Amphipoda